Allo Darlin' is the debut full-length from Allo Darlin'. It was released June 7, 2010 on Fortuna Pop!.

Reception 

The AllMusic review by K. Ross Hoffman awarded the album 4 stars stating, "The playing is consistently strong and, with a few tender-hearted exceptions, briskly bouncy and grooving".

Track listing 
All tracks by Allo Darlin'

 "Dreaming" – 3:22
 "The Polaroid Song" – 4:14
 "Silver Dollars" – 4:12
 "Kiss Your Lips" – 3:46
 "Heartbeat Chili" – 4:18
 "If Loneliness Was Art" – 3:30
 "Woody Allen" – 2:39
 "Let's Go Swimming" – 4:31
 "My Heart Is a Drummer" – 3:17
 "What Will Be Will Be" – 3:37

Personnel 

 Elizabeth Morris – vocals, glockenspiel, handclapping, percussion, piano, ukulele,
 Paul Rains – electric guitar, backing vocals, fender rhodes, korg M1, lap steel guitar, omnichord
 Bill Botting – bass guitar, backing vocals, vocals
 Michael Collins – drums, backing vocals, percussion
 The Friday Night Choir – backing vocals
 Dan Mayfield – violin
 Monster Bobby – vocals
 Adam Nunn – mastering
 Keiron Phelan – flute
 Matthew Reynolds – backing vocals
 Simon Trought – backing vocals, engineer, handclapping, mandolin, mixing, percussion, producer
 Nik Vestberg – photography, sleeve design

References 

2010 debut albums
Allo Darlin' albums
Fortuna Pop! Records albums